The Plymouth Valiant (first appearing in 1959 as simply the Valiant) is an automobile which was marketed by the Plymouth division of the Chrysler Corporation in the United States from the model years of 1960 through 1976. It was created to give the company an entry in the compact car market emerging in the late 1950s. The Valiant was also built and marketed, without the Plymouth brand, worldwide in countries including Argentina, Australia, Brazil, Canada, Finland, Mexico, New Zealand, South Africa, Sweden and Switzerland, as well as other countries in South America and Western Europe. It became well known for its excellent durability and reliability, and was one of Chrysler's best-selling automobiles during the 1960s and 1970s, helping to keep the company solvent during an economic downturn.

Road & Track magazine considered the Valiant to be "one of the best all-around domestic cars".

First generation (1960–1962)

In May 1957, Chrysler president Lester Lum "Tex" Colbert established a committee to develop a competitor in the burgeoning compact car market which included the popular VW Beetle, the new American Motors Rambler and upcoming entries from GM, Ford and Studebaker. Design chief Virgil Exner created a car that was smaller and lighter than a full-size car without sacrificing passenger and luggage space. Originally named the "Falcon" after Exner's 1955 Chrysler Falcon concept car, the vehicle was renamed the "Valiant" (which means "having or showing courage or valor") honoring Henry Ford II's request to use the name for the Ford Falcon.  The Valiant debuted at the 44th British International Motor Show in London on October 26, 1959. It was introduced as a 1960 model and was officially considered a distinct brand, advertised with the tagline "Nobody's kid brother, this one stands on its own four tires." For the 1961 model year, the Valiant was classified as a Plymouth model. The 1961–62 Dodge Lancer was essentially a rebadged Valiant with different trim and styling details. For the 1962 model year, the Valiant returned without Plymouth branding but was sold only in Plymouth Chrysler, Chrysler Dodge, or the rare standalone Plymouth dealerships. For model year 1964 and onwards the car was sold in the United States only as a Plymouth Valiant.

The Valiant was less radical in configuration than General Motors' compact Chevrolet Corvair, which had an air-cooled rear-mounted engine, but was considered more aesthetically daring than the also-new Falcon and Studebaker Lark compacts, which had more conventional looks; the Valiant boasted a radical design that continued Exner's "Forward Look" styling with "sleek, crisp lines which flow forward in a dart or wedge shape". The flush-sided appearance was a carried-over feature from Chrysler's Ghia-built D'Elegance and Adventure concept cars which also gave the Valiant additional inches of interior room. The Valiant's styling was new, yet with specific design elements that tied it to other contemporary Chrysler products, such as the canted tailfins tipped with cat's-eye shaped tail lamps and the simulated Continental spare tire pressed into the trunk lid that were thematically similar to those on the Imperial and the 300F. According to Exner, the stamped wheel design was used not only to establish identity with other Chryslers, but to "dress up the rear deck area without detracting from the look of directed forward motion".

The Valiant debuted an all-new six-cylinder overhead-valve engine, the famous slant-six. Its inline cylinders were uniquely canted 30° to the right (passenger side), permitting a lower hoodline.  The water pump was shifted from front to alongside, shortening engine length.  And an efficient long-branch individual-runner intake manifold was fitted, an advance that benefited from Chrysler's pioneering work in tuned intakes. The slant-six produced both more power and better economy than similar American made economy straight sixes, and it soon gained a reputation for dependability. Project engineer Willem Weertman and his team had designed a simple yet robust workhorse, from its four-main forged crankshaft to a simplified "mechanical" valve train. Block and head castings were unusually thick because both were intended to be cast in either iron or aluminum with the same tooling. Although volume casting techniques of the era could not yet reliably produce complex head castings in aluminum, over 50,000 die-cast aluminum-block versions of the  engine were produced between late 1961 and early 1963 and sold as extra-cost options.

The 1960 Valiant exemplified Chrysler's leadership in aluminum die casting. While the aluminum slant-six engine block did not enter production until 1961, the Kokomo, Indiana, foundry produced a number of other aluminum parts for the 1960 Valiant, all instrumental in reducing the total weight of the car. These parts included the oil pump, water pump, alternator housing, Hyper-Pak (see below) and standard production intake manifolds, all-new Torqueflite A-904 automatic transmission case and  tail extension, and numerous other small parts. These cast-aluminum parts were roughly 60% lighter than corresponding parts of cast iron. A cast aluminum part had the benefit of reduced section thickness where strength was not a vital consideration. Section thickness of cast-iron parts were often dictated by casting practice, which required at least  to ensure good castings. Exterior decorative parts stamped from aluminum were lighter than similar chromium-plated zinc castings. The entire grille and surrounding molding on the Valiant weighed only . If this same assembly had been made of die-cast zinc, as many grilles of the era were, it would have weighed an estimated .

The Valiant A-body platform utilized "unit-body" or "unibody" construction (not used by the Chrysler Corporation since the Airflow models of the 1930s) rather than "body-on-frame" construction. Instead of a bolted-in forestructure used in other unibody designs, the Valiant incorporated a welded-in front understructure and stressed front sheet metal. The fenders, quarter panels, floor and roof contributed to the stiffness of the body shell. A unit wheelbase comparison showed the Valiant to be 95% stiffer in torsion and 50% stiffer in beam than a 1959 Plymouth with separate body-on-frame construction. Dynamic testing showed that high structural resonant frequencies were attained, indicating greater damping and reduced body shake.

The front suspension consisted of unequal length control arms with torsion bars, while the rear suspension used a live axle supported by asymmetric leaf springs. Chrysler used this design through the entire production of the Valiant and other A-body models, with revisions to the suspension components themselves for the 1962, 1967, 1968, and 1973 models.

Hyper-Pak

Plymouth product planning director Jack Charipar gave impetus for a stock car racing version of the Valiant, and while Chrysler engineers developed the Hyper-Pak for the track, the Hyper-Pak dealer tuning kit option was made available in limited quantities on December 1, 1959. Features included  of torque, a 10.5:1 compression ratio, dual exhaust pipes on a single muffler, a manual choke and a larger  fuel tank. Dick Maxwell, a Chrysler engineer responsible for many of the super stock Mopars, recalls that "When NASCAR decided to run a compact road race in conjunction with the 1960 Daytona 500, all the factories got involved. We built a fleet of seven Hyper Pak Valiants with 148-hp 170-ci [Slant] sixes having a single four-barrel with ram manifold." The race Hyper-Paks also featured high-load valve springs and long-duration, high-lift camshafts.

NASCAR's new compact car category debuted at the Daytona International Speedway on January 31, 1960. The race length was 10 laps, . The second race of the day used only the tri-oval track, 20 laps on its full  length totaling . A multi-car accident on the fourth lap took out the four Valiant leaders including one driven by Richard Petty. Panch was not among them because car trouble delayed his start and he was busy passing slower cars from the rear of the field when the leaders crashed. The remaining Valiants placed 1-2-3 and Panch again went into the winner's circle. Maxwell again recalls that "It was a Plymouth runway. We finished first through seventh. Our cars were so fast, NASCAR never did that race again."

Station Wagon

The Valiant station wagons had  of cargo space yet required two feet less parking space than a full-size Plymouth. A locking luggage compartment on the two-seat models included the use of "Captive-Aire" (run-flat) tires. The compartment, located in the cargo deck, served as a spare tire storage space for models equipped with standard tires in which case the lock was optional. Captive-Aire tires, which did not require a spare, were standard equipment on the three-seat models. An aluminum tailgate window screen was available for the exclusion of insects when on vacation and camping trips.

The four-door station wagon, assembled only at the Dodge main plant in Hamtramck, was available in V100 and V200 trim in two- and three-seat configurations; the third seat faced the rear. Both models were the lowest priced four-door station wagons in America. The two-seat model was $60 under both the four-door Lark and Rambler station wagons, and the three-seater was $186 below the Rambler four-door.

Design and mechanical revisions
The first-generation Valiants, though sold in three model years, existed in four distinct configurations: early 1960, late 1960, 1961, and 1962. The base-model V100 cars received relatively minimal ornamentation.

1960

Early 1960 models, particularly the V200 high-trim cars, featured extensive brightwork and ornamentation. An  chrome spear atop each front fender, an inner reveal ring on the deck lid's spare tire stamping, a "V200" nameplate on the dashboard, and stainless steel windshield and backlight reveal moldings, which were deleted from production, replaced with less costly flexible mylar-faced plastic locking strips—in approximately January, 1960. Early and late V200s had a continuous stainless steel molding following the tailfin crease as it swept down in front of the rear wheel, then continuing forward along the lower break line in both doors and the front fender. The radiator grille was brite-dipped stamped aluminum, and a central grille badge doubled as the hood release. Script "Valiant" callouts were placed in the center of the deck lid's spare-tire stamping and on each front fender.

During the 1960 model year, there were revisions to improve lubrication of the two rear connecting rods, voltage regulator function, cold starting and idling, acceleration, and to prevent breakage of the front and rear manifold mounting studs.

1961

For 1961, new two-door sedan and hardtop models were released, but no changes were made to the four-door sedan and wagon sheet metal. The interior and exterior trim were changed to provide model year differentiation, a mild form of planned obsolescence. The radiator grille stamping was the same as in 1960, but for 1961 it was painted with a pattern of black squares. The central grille ornament was still pulled from the bottom to release the hood, but it was now faced with an emblem having a white field with the blue-and-red stylized "V"  logo, rather than 1960's red placard with a gold script reading "Valiant". The side trim was changed; a  stainless spear was placed at the rear of each tailfin crease, a hockey stick-shaped trim was applied to the lower break line, and the front fender/door crease was capped with a long stainless spear. The tailfins were each topped with three transverse chrome strips, and a large horizontal emblem containing a round plastic "V200" callout was centered in the deck lid's spare-tire stamping. Matching round "V200" callouts were placed in round housings at the midpoint of the front fender spears. Inside the car, the instrument cluster was largely carried over, but 1960's black gauges with white callouts gave way to 1961's white gauges with black callouts.  For the first time, Valiants wore "Plymouth" script just left of the right-side taillight.

Mechanical revisions for 1961 included new carburetors, the availability of positive crankcase ventilation (which was newly mandated on cars sold in California), the availability of dealer-installed air conditioning, the relocation of the alternator from the left to the right side of the engine, and extensive revisions throughout most of the Valiant's systems and components. Late in the 1961 model year, the larger  slant-six engine became available in the Valiant, its use having been expanded earlier in the year from the larger Dodges and Plymouths to the Valiant-sized Dodge Lancer.

1962

The 1962 model year saw an extensive facelift. The radiator grille was flattened and shortened. The hood release was moved to a knob at the top of the grille frame. The central grille emblem was deleted, except on the top-line Signet 200 two-door hardtop model, which received a black-painted grille with a round central emblem incorporating the red-and-blue stylized "V" Valiant emblem. The Signet 200 had pleated, leather-like bucket seats, custom tailored interior trim, deep-pile carpeting, special trunk lid emblem, different headlamp frames and special side moldings; it was America's lowest-priced hardtop with bucket seats.

Fender and hood stampings were similar to the 1960-61 items, but neither identical nor interchangeable. At the rear, the cat's-eye tail lamps were deleted. A wraparound stainless trim was applied to the tailfins, below which were placed round tail lamps set into stamped aluminum bezels. These occupied the space formerly available for optional backup lamps, which for 1962 flanked the license plate below the rear bumper. The spare-tire stamping was eliminated from the deck lid, which was now a smooth stamping with a small central ridge at its trailing edge. On V200 deck lids, a large round emblem surrounded an oblong block-letter "Valiant" callout on a black field. Similar block-letter/black-field callouts were placed on each front fender. On the Signet, the deck lid was adorned with a smaller round emblem surrounding the red-and-blue stylized "V" logo.  The "Plymouth" script disappeared from the 1962 Valiant, as in 1960.

V200 side trim reverted to the 1960 concept, following the tailfin crease and lower body break crease. However, the 1962 trim was more massive and contained an oblong triple-window effect at the rear of the body break crease. On Signets, the front fenders had an open-centered double spear, connected at the front and back, within which was contained a secondary body paint color.

The 1962 Valiant was given a completely-new asymmetric instrument cluster. Like that of the larger 1962 Plymouth models, the new Valiant cluster was highly regarded for its clean design and easy readability. A large round speedometer was placed at the left of the cluster, with separate round gauges for fuel level, engine temperature, and charging system condition (amperes) in a row to the right of the speedometer. Automatic transmission pushbuttons were in a column at the left edge of the panel, and heater pushbuttons were in a column at the right edge. A new shallower-dish steering wheel was also introduced.

Mechanical revisions for 1962 were extensive. The electrical system was extensively upgraded, with a new gear-reduction starter, new alternator, more fuses, and printed circuit boards rather than individual wires for the instrument cluster. Carburetors were improved again, the manual transmission gearshift was moved from the floor to the steering column, there were new 45°-shear engine mounts replacing the previous vertical-shear items, exhaust systems were made of more corrosion-resistant (aluminized) materials, and axle ratios were altered for better fuel economy. Manual steering ratio was changed from 20:1 to 24:1, and both power and manual steering gearboxes were new, the latter now housed in aluminum rather than iron. Most of the front suspension components were redesigned (now with balloon seals, an industry first), and it was claimed they needed lubrication only every .

In October 1961, the Society of Illustrators presented Exner the 1962 Styling Award for outstanding design of the 1962 Signet 200; the award lauded Exner's "creative sculpted design" of the Valiant, "an automobile of outstanding originality, restraint and spirited beauty".

Second generation (1963–1966)

The Valiant was totally reskinned for 1963 with a  shorter wheelbase; it had a wide, flat hood and a flat square rear deck. The upper belt feature line ran from the rear body, in a gentle sweep, to the front fender tip. Here it was "veed" back and down to the trailing edge of the front fender. The roofline was flatter and sharpened in profile. The grille was a variation of the inverted trapezoid shape that characterized contemporary Chryslers, with a fine mesh insert. Advances in body structure, many accessories and a new spring-staged choke were promotional highlights. The Valiant was offered as a two-door hardtop and convertible, a two- or four-door sedan, and a four-door station wagon. The hardtop and the convertible, with manual- or optional power-operated top, were offered only in the high V200 and premium Signet trim levels. The optional  slant-six engine was initially offered with the die-cast aluminum block introduced in late 1961, but early in the 1963 model year the aluminum block was discontinued; both the 170 and 225 engines were thenceforth available only with iron blocks. In December 1962, Plymouth's first-ever vinyl-covered roof became available as an option on the Signet. The 1963 Valiant was much better received by the public, and sales for the year rose to 225,056. The Valiant was sold in Mexico as a "Chrysler Valiant" starting with the 1963 model year. This was also the first year that it was coupled with the Dodge Dart, which had been previously a lower-end full-size model.  In the U.S, the Valiant finally joined the Plymouth brand for the rest of its production.

Building on a worldwide record sales success in 1963, the Valiant moved into 1964 with design changes giving better economy, reliability and performance. Changes in the 1964 Valiant included a restyled front end featuring a new grille with a horizontal bars. A "Valiant" medallion was placed at the center of the grille where the bars formed a flat bulge. Vertical taillamps replaced the previous horizontal items. The ring-style rear deck decoration was replaced with a Valiant script located at the right-hand corner. There were few styling changes in the 1965 Valiants, but the 1966 Valiants had
significant superficial changes: a split grille with fine-patterned insert; new front fenders; new rear fenders on the sedans; new bevelled-edge rear deck lid; heavier rear bumper; and a new roofline with large rear window.

The new Chrysler-built A833 four-speed manual transmission was offered together with a Hurst shifter. Another new option was the "Sure-Grip" limited slip differential, which was touted as a bad-weather safety feature and also offered traction benefits in performance driving.

The Valiant was extremely popular in the US, Canada, and numerous markets outside North America. Plymouth supported a successful team of Valiant two-door sedans in the 1965 and 1966 SCCA Manufacturers Rally Championships.

V8 engine
In mid-1964, Chrysler released an all-new  V8 engine as optional equipment in all Valiants. This compact V8 engine, with solid tappets, the first in Chrysler's LA engine range and that would last until 2002, was specifically engineered to fit in the compact A-body engine compartment. Valiants with the optional 273 engine came with V-shaped emblems at the sides of the cowl. With the  273, the Valiant became the lowest-priced V-8 automobile in the world. For 1965, a hotter  version of the 273 called the Commando 273 was made available with 10.5:1 compression, a  four-barrel carburetor, performance camshaft, low restriction exhaust and other modifications.

The Dodge Lancer, which had been almost identical to the Valiants of 1961–62, was replaced in 1963 by the Dart. The Dart was available in all the same body styles as the Valiant, except there was no Dodge equivalent of the Barracuda. All Darts used a larger,  wheelbase, except for wagons which used the Valiant's  wheelbase.

Third generation (1967–1973)

The Valiant was completely redesigned for 1967 model year and the station wagons, hardtops, and convertibles were dropped. Buyers who wanted a Valiant-type hardtop coupe or convertible could choose a similarly-styled Barracuda, which was still based on the Valiant with a slightly sportier style. The new Valiant model range included two- and four-door sedans on a newly lengthened  wheelbase. The design was straightforward and rectilinear. The body sides were mildly sculptured with a tapering lower feature line that widened toward the wheels. The new fenders had a vertical slab look. The grille was vertically split and subdivided horizontally. Vertical taillights were segmented and had a fanned-out look. Federally-mandated safety equipment was provided on all 1967s, including a new dual-chamber brake master cylinder, energy-absorbing steering column, wheel, and instrument panel controls; shoulder belt mountings for outboard front passengers, a new 4-way hazard flasher, and, for 1970, lane-change directional signals were included.

For the 1968 model, the horizontal division bar was removed from the grille. A fine cross hatched insert was framed by a segmented chrome surround. Model nameplates were moved from the rear fender to the front fender. The ,  V8 was a Valiant option for the first time.  All North American Chrysler products got front and rear side marker lights, amber in front, red in the rear.  These were round in shape, surrounded by an attractive chrome bezel.  Valiants built after January 1, 1968, also got new front shoulder belts as standard.

For 1969, a new one-piece, full-width grille, new taillights and trim were featured. Standard engines were unchanged, although refinements in the Chrysler "clean air system" (formerly "clean air package") produced better operating economy from the six-cylinder engines. Improved drum brake self-adjusters, a more efficient power steering pump, and improvements to the optional Sure-Grip differential were also highlighted.  Starting with cars built on January 1, 1969, front seat headrests were now standard. 1969 Valiants got new rectangular side marker lamps with federally required integral reflectors.

For 1970, the Valiant was carried over with detail changes, including a new black plastic grille sculptured differently from 1969's metal item. The central portion protruded flush with the forward edge of the hood, while the remainder of the grille was set back from the front plane. The two-door sedan was dropped, replaced by the new Duster coupe (see below). For all except export Valiants, the base 170 engine was replaced by a new  version of the slant-six. The 198 gave better performance than the 170, and was less costly to make, since it used the same cylinder block as the 225. The Valiant was virtually unchanged for 1971; small revisions included removal of the center grille emblem and a new kind of finish treatment on the grille surround. It now had a blacked-out look instead of the previous argent silver treatment. For the 1970 and 1971 models, exterior and interior trim were slightly revised, and there were engineering changes for better driveability, improved soundproofing and decreased emissions, the latter in compliance with regulations mandated by the newly created Environmental Protection Agency (EPA) implementing new devices such as an EGR valve and an activated charcoal evaporative emissions system. The 1971 Valiant eventually set sales records with 256,930 calendar year deliveries, so there was little motivation to change it for 1972. Only details of the taillights and grille were altered for the 1972 Valiants. New surface-mount sidemarker lamp-reflector units replaced the more costly previous flush-mount items.

Beginning in 1971, a badge-engineered version of the  wheelbase Dodge Dart Swinger called the "Valiant Scamp" was offered. This used the Dart Swinger two-door hardtop body shell with Valiant front sheet metal and dual taillamps carried over from the 1970 Dodge Dart.

1972 saw the Valiant's best sales ever, with 330,373 sold.

For 1973, the vent wing windows were deleted from the Scamp, and all models were given a new grille and front bumpers able to withstand damage at a  impact, as well as steel beams inside the doors to protect vehicle occupants in side-impact collisions as mandated by NHTSA. The door beams, the new bumpers and their impact-absorbing mounts, a rubber-booted telescoping system attached to the car's structure, added mass to the Valiant. At the same time, engines were being progressively detuned to comply with increasingly stringent emissions regulations. Performance and economy suffered as a result.

Through the early 1970s, the Valiant took more than 40% of Plymouth's total sales volume. These models also had considerable success in foreign markets. Worldwide, Chrysler affiliates and subsidiaries sold American- or Canadian-made Valiants from complete knock down kits, as well as locally designed and engineered Valiants and Valiant-based vehicles incorporating a mix of North American and local design and components.

Fourth generation (1974–1976)

In 1974, the  wheelbase variant of the A-body sedan was dropped, and the Valiant sedan became a rebadged Dart. The larger size resulted in thicker C-pillars and new rear fender contours. Thenceforth, the only differences between the Valiant and Dart were minor cosmetics. The 1973 Valiant grille and front sheet metal were retained for 1974, but the front bumper's rubber guards were chromed. The taillights were extensively redesigned, resulting in a more formal look. The US federal  bumper standards were applied to rear bumpers for the 1974 models, adding even more weight to the Valiant. Since the Duster (1970), Dart-based Scamp (1971) and Dart-based sedan (1974) displaced both of the Valiant's 1967 bodies, they could be considered to represent a fourth generation of Valiants.

1974 Valiant was also available in a "Scamp package" which included 318 V8 engine, four door, three-speed automatic transmission, power steering, power disc brakes, chrome trim, vinyl roof, AC, carpet, split vinyl bucket seat bench, radio, rear window defroster blower, and 120 mph speedometer standard.  Production was limited and ordered as customers requested the package, a few hundred were produced.

1974 introduced the Valiant Brougham and its twin, the Dodge Dart special edition. Available in two- or four-door models, they were a compact luxury car meant as an attractive alternative to larger luxury cars following the 1973 oil crisis. The Brougham had generous chrome trim, a vinyl top, deep cut-pile carpeting, velour cloth upholstery, interior door padding, color-keyed or simulated wire wheel covers, and a special selection of paint and trim combinations. Much of the optional equipment on a regular Valiant became standard equipment on Brougham models such as power steering, power disc brakes, air conditioning, cruise control, electric rear window defroster and an AM/FM radio.

With a slightly restyled grille, 1975 models were essentially carry-overs from 1974 except that California and certain high-altitude models received catalytic converters and required unleaded gasoline. The 1975 Valiants had several new items available to buyers with increasing interest in fuel economy. These included radial tires and a "Fuel Pacer" system that lit a warning light to tell the driver he was driving uneconomically, as well as Chrysler's A833OD four-speed manual transmission, the first four-speed Chrysler had offered with a six-cylinder engine in the North American market since 1965. There were new  spark plugs and batteries and a "clincher" warranty that covered everything on the car except trim for 12 months with no mileage restrictions.

1976 models were virtually identical to 1975s; amber rather than clear front park/turn signal lights were used and the parking brake pull-handle was changed to a foot pedal.

A38 police package

In 1976, the Valiant was available as a Code A38 police package car and offered in three basic engine sizes: E24 (California emission standards) and E25 (federal)  single-barrel slant-six; E44 , twin-barrel V-8; E58 , four-barrel V-8 with single (California) or dual (federal) exhaust. It was the E58 that Chrysler recommended for police service as it was the only one with "added endurance features to improve durability". The E58 produced 175 net hp in California trim and 220 net hp in federal form. The E58 dual exhaust engine (sans catalytic converters) made for a very fast Valiant squad car. The Seattle Police Department using the Valiant A38 reported a 46 percent drop in the preventable accident rate among police officers, and according to a Motor Trend police survey, the A38 Valiant had much better evasive capabilities, better overall visibility, and was generally easier to drive than the full-size squad cars. A special handling package applied to the A38 Valiant included front and rear antisway bars. However, the Valiant was not physically durable enough; it lacked additional frame welds and rear cross-member reinforcements standard on all other Mopar A38 packages. More importantly, the front K-frame of the Valiant was prone to failure under severe police use.

Replacement with Plymouth Volaré and Dodge Aspen
In 1976, the Plymouth Volaré and Dodge Aspen F-body cars were introduced mid-year replacing the Valiant and Dart, respectively. Production of the A-body shifted to Saint Louis Assembly while Hamtramck Assembly was dedicated to the new F-body, which did not maintain their predecessors' reputation for quality and durability and in fact reversed it. The change hurt Chrysler's reputation and profitability, contributing to its near-bankruptcy in 1979–80.

Derivative models

Barracuda

Automotive trends in the early middle 1960s had all the US automakers looking at making compact sporty cars. The Valiant was a natural choice of basis for Chrysler's efforts in this direction. Ford's Mustang gave this type of vehicle its common "pony car" moniker, but in fact Chrysler beat Ford to market by two weeks with the April 1, 1964 release of the Barracuda fastback. The Barracuda used the Valiant's  wheelbase and the Valiant hood, headlamp bezels, windshield, vent windows, quarter panels and bumpers; all other sheet metal and glass was new. This hybrid design approach significantly reduced the development and tooling cost and time for the new model. Unfortunately, the Barracuda was as similar to the Valiant as the Mustang was different from the Falcon, and its introduction was, at first, barely noticed by most buyers.

The fastback body shape was achieved primarily with an enormous rear window, or backlight, which wrapped down to the fenderline. Pittsburgh Plate Glass (PPG) collaborated with Chrysler designers in producing this  rear window, the largest ever installed on a standard production car up to that time. The following year, the fenders and taillamps that had been introduced on the 1964 Barracuda were used on the whole 1965 Valiant range except for the wagon, which got different taillamps.

The second-generation Barracuda, though still a  wheelbase A-body sharing many components with the Valiant, was given Barracuda-specific styling and its own range of models including convertibles and fastback and notchback hardtops.  A wide range of engines were available on the Barracuda throughout its production lifecycle, from a 145-hp 225 cubic-inch (3.7L) slant six, up through high-compression small- and big-block V8s.

Although the first and second generation Barracudas were heavily based on the contemporary Valiants, Plymouth wanted them perceived as a distinct models. Consequently, the "Valiant" chrome script that appeared on the 1964 model's trunk lid was deleted on the 1965 model in the US market. For 1966, the stylized red-and-blue Valiant "V" emblems were replaced on the Barracuda with a model-specific stylized fish logo. In other markets such as Canada and South Africa, where Valiant was a marque in its own right, the car remained known as the "Valiant Barracuda" until the A-body Barracuda was discontinued after 1969.

For 1970, the Barracuda lost all commonality with the Valiant as an all-new E-body Barracuda was produced.

Duster

Plymouth introduced a sporty new model for 1970: the two-door fastback Duster. The same technique that spawned the 1964 Barracuda was employed for the Duster. It was designed to use the same front end sheet metal, running gear, and  wheelbase as the Valiant, but Plymouth's stylists gave the car an entirely new look by using a modified fastback configuration with radically curved side glass having only half the curvature radius of conventional side glass. The Duster was an immediate hit as a sporty alternative to the now larger and more expensive Barracuda. Throughout its production lifetime, the vast majority of Dusters were built with the Slant Six engine (available in 198 and 225 cubic inch versions) and TorqueFlite automatic transmission.

An aggressive "shark tooth" grille was offered on the fastback Duster 340 and new-for-1971 Duster Twister models. The Twister was a "performance appearance package" produced in response to increasing premiums on muscle cars, many of which were calculated using the vehicle's power-to-weight ratio as an actuarial gauge. Despite the "dust whirl" side stripes and "Twister" decals, Rallye road wheels, dual racing mirrors, twin hood scoops, flat-black hood paint with strobe stripes, and plaid cloth-and-vinyl trim interior available in four colors, the biggest engine available was the  V8.

However, the 1974 Duster was nearly  heavier than the 1971 model on account of the heavier bumpers, side-impact door beams, emission control equipment, and added soundproofing. Even with performance options such as the four-speed manual transmission, Hurst shifter and Sure-Grip differential with 3.55:1 axle ratio, 0–60 mph and quarter-mile times increased roughly two seconds compared to those for the 1970 Duster. However, higher fuel prices and performance-car insurance surcharges deterred many buyers as the interest in high performance waned.

International variants

Canada (1960-1966)
Chrysler Canada marketed the Valiant at Dodge and Plymouth dealers under a standalone "Valiant" marque. The Canadian 1960–62 Valiant was visually similar to its American counterpart except the badge on the trunk lid read "by Chrysler" instead of "Plymouth". Besides minor differences in interior and exterior trim, the alternator was an extra-cost option in Canada through 1962 while it was standard equipment in America. An anti-ice system for the carburetor's throttle body, engine block heater, battery warmer, electric car interior heater and other cold-climate items were available as factory or dealer-installed options. Air conditioning, which was first offered in the US 1961 models, was not made available north of the border until 1966. Some Canadian-made Auto-Lite (now Prestolite) electrical components were used in lieu of the American-production Chrysler-built components. The Windsor, Ontario, plant was a source for left- and right-hand-drive export Valiants as knock down kits.

For 1963 and 1964, the Canadian Valiant used US Plymouth Valiant front sheet metal with the US Dodge Dart body and  wheelbase (except wagons, which—like all 1963–1966 Dart and Valiant wagons—were on the  wheelbase).

For 1965, Chrysler Canada sold both the  wheelbase and the  wheelbase A-body vehicles, all badged as Valiants, and all with the US Dart dashboard and instrument cluster. For 1966, the shorter Valiant was dropped from the Canadian market and all Canadian Valiants were now rebadged US Darts.

The Canadian Barracuda, badged as the "Valiant Barracuda", was built in Canada in 1964 and 1965 but was imported for 1966. Like the Valiant, the Barracuda had no Plymouth markings.

With the coming of the US-Canada Auto Pact of 1965, Chrysler could ship cars and parts both ways over the border and in 1967 the company began importing Plymouth Valiants and Dodge Darts from the US, as well as exporting Darts and Valiants from Windsor to the US.

Australia (1962–1981)

The Valiant was introduced in Australia in 1962, as a right-hand drive version of the American 1961 model; just over 1,000 of these were sold before they were superseded by a locally-adapted version of the US 1962 model. As in other markets outside the United States, they were sold not as Plymouths but as Chryslers, replacing the previous Chrysler Royal range. The AP5 model, introduced for 1963, was built locally by Chrysler Australia—the first of eleven Valiant model ranges built until 1981. Earlier models bore some resemblance to American Valiants and Dodge Darts until 1971 when the VH model was released; its locally-designed body became the basis of all subsequent Australian Valiants and bore no resemblance to any US Valiants. The coupe utility or "ute" (car-based pickup truck), the Valiant Charger coupe, and the Chrysler by Chrysler luxury car were all Valiant-based models unique to Australia. 

Australian Valiants were locally built in New Zealand and South Africa; and were exported to the United Kingdom, Japan, and other right-hand drive markets. 

Chrysler Australia was eventually bought out by Mitsubishi Motors Australia and the last Australian Valiants were produced by Mitsubishi from 1980 to 1981.

Mexico (1963–1988)
Valiants, which were assembled and sold in Mexico from 1963 through 1976, were essentially the same A-body models as their US counterparts with minor differences. The Mexican Valiant lineup included a unique two-door hardtop produced from 1963 to 1969 called the "Acapulco" named after the coastal resort city. Based on a V200 Signet, the Acapulco was not available in the US or anywhere else outside of Mexico. The most notable features included a cobra snakeskin vinyl roof and emblems of Acapulco in the interior and on the trunk lid. Other features included bucket seats, upgraded interior and remote controlled passenger side mirrors. The car was powered by 2bbl 225 slant-six which was being used concurrently in the Australian market; the manual transmission was operated by a four-on-the-floor Hurst gearshift.

The Valiant Duster was introduced in Mexico in 1970, the same as the Plymouth Duster sold in the US market. Starting in 1972, the Valiant Duster got the same body as the US-market Dodge Demon/Dart Sport. In 1976, A-body cars were discontinued in North America, replaced by the Plymouth Volare/Dodge Aspen. Mexican Volares were badged as "Valiant Volares"; these vehicles had the Volare rear end but with the Aspen grille. When the Volare was replaced with the Reliant "K-cars" in 1981, these cars were marketed as "Valiant Volare Ks" as well. The Valiant Volare K was the last Valiant-badged car sold in Mexico.

New Zealand (1963-1981)
New Zealand's first Valiant model was the Australian 1963 Chrysler Valiant "S" series. New Zealand assembly of the Australian models began in 1964 by Todd Motors first in Petone, Wellington, and from 1974 in Porirua, Wellington. Only four-door sedans and utilities (pickups) were produced. Station wagons, coupes and the mid-70s upmarket Chrysler by Chrysler sedans were otherwise fully imported from Australia. Todd Motors also assembled the Australian two-door Valiant Charger 770 between 1971 and 1976. Latter Charger models were fully imported. Todd Motors ceased production in 1981.

Argentina (1962–1968)
In 1962, Chrysler-Fevre Argentina S.A. started building the 1960 version of the US Plymouth Valiant under the Chrysler nameplate (although later most of the cars were sold under the "Valiant" nameplate as an independent brand). Only the four-door version was produced. Two models were offered, the "Valiant V200" (Valiant I), with a 2,790 cc engine, and, since 1963, the "Valiant II" with a 3,687 cc engine. In 1965 the "Valiant III" was launched. Despite its name, this car was similar to the 1963 US Dodge Dart. It was offered in three trims, standard, Coronado (luxury) and GT (sport). In 1967 the "Valiant IV" came out. This car also looked very much like the US 1966 Dodge Dart, offering the same trims than the previous version. Production ceased for the Valiants in 1968, when they were replaced by the GTX /Coronado/Polara lineup. However, for the 1968 model year a basic "Valiant" trim of the Coronado/Polara was offered.

South Africa (1960-1980)
Right-hand-drive Plymouth Valiants were assembled and sold in South Africa Branded as the DeSoto Rebel from 1960 and were assembled at the Chrysler plant in Cape Town. The cars followed the U.S Plymouth and Dodge Dart models and the knock-down kits were sourced from Canada. By 1966 the Valiant was the top selling car in South Africa. Although Chrysler in the U.S stopped making Valiant and Dart station wagons after 1966, station wagons continued to be built in South Africa using U.S front ends on Australian Valiant VC/VE/VF wagon bodies.  

Between 1968 and 1970 a local version of the two-door Plymouth Barracuda was built and sold as the Valiant Barracuda (as in Canada.) Between 1970 and 1973 a local coupe model derived from the U.S Dodge Demon and Plymouth Duster was built and sold as the Valiant Charger. 

In 1972 South Africa switched to assembling Australian Valiants, starting with the VH Valiant. These were available in sedan, station wagon and bakkie (pickup truck/ute.) The Australian Chrysler by Chrysler two-door model was not available but the four door model was sold as the "Dodge SE" and was built with the same locally-sourced 225 cid six-cylinder engine used in all South African-built Valiants. 

The Australian VJ Valiant was assembled in South Africa and sold as the Valiant J series. The lineup included the Rebel, Rebel 660, Regal, Regal Safari, Charger Coupe, and the VIP. The bakkie was sold as the Fast-Body Rustler Utility thereafter. 

At the end of 1976 Chrysler ceased operations in South Africa and the local operation merged with local company Illings (owned by the Anglo-American Corporation.) Thereafter South African Valiants were assembled at the Sigma Motor Corporation plant in Silverton, near Pretoria.

The last Valiants built in South Africa were the Australian Valiant CL which was built from 1975 to 1978 and the Australian Valiant CM which was built from 1978 to 1980. These were marketed as the Chrysler SE.

United Kingdom (1959-1976)
Chryslers were imported into the United Kingdom throughout the 20th Century, sourced from both the United States or Canada in factory right-hand drive. Chrysler International in Belgium was in charge of all European imports. The U.K received RHD Plymouth Valiants as well as other Chrysler and Dodge vehicles until 1967 whereupon it was decided by Chrysler International that all RHD markets would thereafter be supplied with vehicles from Australia (with the exception of South Africa which continued to build U.S-derived models until 1972 before it too switched to Australian models.) Chrysler's European head office appointed Chrysler Motors Ltd. to be the Australian-import concessionaires for the U.K, and Warwick Wright Ltd. to be the distributors. The announcement was made in Autocar magazine, on 16th October 1966. 

The Australian VC, VE, and VF Valiant models were thereafter imported to the U.K in saloon (sedan) and estate (station wagon) form, with the VIP model added in 1969. Rootes Group dealers sold the Australian Valiants on a shared-commission basis with Warwick Wright. Australian VG, VH, VJ, and VK Valiants continued to be sold in the U.K throughout the 1970s, including the Australian Valiant Charger coupe and long-wheelbase Chrysler By Chrysler. Imports ceased after 1976.

In popular culture
Lloyd Haynes's character Pete Dixon in the late 1960s-early 1970s US television show Room 222 drives a red 1963 Plymouth Valiant Signet convertible.

Collectibility
The Valiant is a collectable car today, particularly early models, as they are rarer. However, very few early Valiants survive as, until recently, few collectors considered sedans attractive; therefore, outstanding examples fetch high appraisal values today.

References

External links

 IMCDB: Plymouth Valiants in Movies and TV shows
 Valiant virtual museum
 Plymouth brochures at Oldcarbrochures.com 

1970s cars
1976 disestablishments
Compact cars
Convertibles
Coupés
Muscle cars
Valiant
Rear-wheel-drive vehicles
Sedans
Station wagons
Valiant vehicles
Cars introduced in 1960